"True" is a song written by Marv Green and Jeff Stevens, and recorded by American country music artist George Strait. It was released in June 1998 as the second single from his album One Step at a Time. The song peaked at number 2 on the U.S. Billboard Hot Country Singles & Tracks (now Hot Country Songs) charts and reached number-one on the Canadian RPM Country Tracks chart.

Critical reception
Larry Flick, of Billboard magazine reviewed the song favorably, saying that the production has an "open, airy feel that underscores the honest emotion in the lyric." He goes on to say that Strait's phrasing "adds appeal and turns a sweet, ordinary song into something special."

Chart performance
The song debuted at number 69 on the Hot Country Singles & Tracks chart dated May 2, 1998, from unsolicited airplay, while "I Just Want to Dance With You" was still climbing that chart. A month later, it was released as a single, and re-entered the chart at number 64 on the week of June 13, 1998. It charted for a total of 25 weeks on that chart, and peaked at number two on the chart dated August 29, 1998.

"True" also went to number one on the American Radio & Records country music charts.

Charts

Year-end charts

References

1998 singles
George Strait songs
Song recordings produced by Tony Brown (record producer)
Songs written by Marv Green
Songs written by Jeff Stevens (singer)
MCA Nashville Records singles
1998 songs